The Yank is an independent comedy film written, directed and starring Sean Lackey.

Plot

Irish American, Tom Murphy, is the first in his family to go to Ireland.  His family sees this as an opportunity to marry "his own kind" so he must choose between his family's expectations and what his heart really wants.

Cast
 Colm Meaney as Fintan McGuire
 Fred Willard as Peter Murphy
 Kevin Farley as Fred Finnegan
 Nicole Forester as Colleen
 Niki Spiridakos as Vanessa
 Sean Lackey as Tom Murphy
 Charlotte Bradley as Fiona McGuire
 Lynette Callaghan as Molly Sweeney
 Martin Maloney as Declan Sweeney
 Brian de Salvo as Hristos
 Spencer Jay Kim as Ricardo
 Maria Corell as Bernie
 Maryanne Nagel as Annie Murphy
 Cody Dove as Stephen

Production
The film is a satirical comedy on Americans that go to Ireland, or any other foreign country, but have high expectations.  Since many Americans mistakenly see Ireland from the vantage of John Wayne's The Quiet Man, the film attempts to expose this absurdity in a "tongue and cheek" way.

Reception
The film received mixed reviews upon release.

Lee Hazell of VultureHound.cok felt that the low budget and film style lacked discipline and production quality.
George Heymont of The Huffington Post felt it had strong comedic moments and was cleverly written. 
Drew Hunt of the Chicago Reader wrote: The cliché dialogue, stereotypical characters, and cheesy, G-rated humor belong in a sitcom.

References

External links
 

2014 films
American romantic comedy films
American independent films
American buddy comedy films
Films set in Ireland
Films shot in Ireland
Films set in Cleveland
Films shot in Cleveland
American mockumentary films
American satirical films
2010s satirical films
2010s English-language films
2010s American films